João Lamine Jaquité (born 22 February 1996) is a Bissau-Guinean professional footballer who plays as a midfielder for Israeli club Hapoel Nof HaGalil.

Club career

Tondela
Born in Bissau, Jaquité started playing organised football in Portugal, with amateurs União Atlético Povoense. On 8 July 2015, C.D. Tondela announced his promotion to the senior team, recently promoted to the Primeira Liga.

Jaquité appeared in his first match as a professional on 20 December 2015, starting and playing 52 minutes in a 1–3 home loss against Vitória F.C. in the top division. In the 2017–18 season, he was loaned to third tier club Lusitano FCV.

Jaquité scored his first goal in the Portuguese top flight on 21 February 2021, in a 4–2 defeat at S.C. Braga.

Vilafranquense
On 20 August 2021, Jaquité signed with U.D. Vilafranquense of the Liga Portugal 2.

International career
Jaquité won his first cap for Guinea-Bissau on 23 March 2019, coming on as a 90th-minute substitute for Zezinho in a 2–2 home draw to Mozambique for the 2019 Africa Cup of Nations qualifiers. He was selected for the finals by coach Baciro Candé.

References

External links

Portuguese League profile 

1996 births
Living people
Sportspeople from Bissau
Bissau-Guinean footballers
Association football midfielders
Primeira Liga players
Liga Portugal 2 players
Campeonato de Portugal (league) players
C.D. Tondela players
Lusitano FCV players
U.D. Vilafranquense players
Liga Leumit players
Hapoel Nof HaGalil F.C. players
Guinea-Bissau international footballers
2019 Africa Cup of Nations players
2021 Africa Cup of Nations players
Bissau-Guinean expatriate footballers
Expatriate footballers in Portugal
Expatriate footballers in Israel
Bissau-Guinean expatriate sportspeople in Portugal
Bissau-Guinean expatriate sportspeople in Israel